Guk is a variety of soup-like dishes in Korean cuisine.

Guk may also refer to:

 Guk clan, of Baekje
 Guanylate kinase